The Indian Film Festival of Los Angeles (IFFLA) is an annual film festival held in Los Angeles, California. Established by Christina Marouda in 2003, as a nonprofit organization devoted to paving the way for a greater appreciation of Indian cinema and diverse culture by providing the public with a selection of films from and about the Indian diaspora by Indian and international filmmakers.

It features, documentaries and shorts  and presents Grand Jury and Audience Choice awards in the following categories: Best Feature, Best Documentary, and Best Short. The IFFLA's Cinematic Scoring Achievement Award is given to composers, honoring film scores. In 2022, the festival is completing 20 years of existence.

Founding
Marouda, a film lover of Greek descent established the festival to garner greater appreciation amongst Western audiences to all forms of Cinema in India. Growing up in Crete, she watched several Indian films, growing up with the films of Satyajit Ray and Nargis, and watched several mainstream Bollywood films, Bengali films and Tamil films during a trip to India in 1999. Whilst enjoying the "ride from laughter to crying" that Hindi films can take audiences on, the festival was not looking to promote Bollywood cinema as much for there were already outlets for this. Marouda has expressed her admiration for director Mani Ratnam, Rajiv Menon's Kandukondain Kandukondain and The Apu Trilogy.

Individual festivals

2003 
The first IFFLA was held in 2003.

Awards
Audience Award for Best Picture  - Kannathil Muthamittal (Mani Ratnam)

2004

2005

2006 

Awards

Cinematic Scoring achievement Award - Gingger Shankar
  Shankar is a Tamil violinist who received the award for her contributions to The Passion of the Christ.

2007 
April 17–22, 2007 at ArcLight Hollywood.  The festival was attended by Quentin Tarantino.

 Opening Night film : Provoked ( Jag Mundhra)
 Closing Night film : Vanaja (film) (Rajnesh Domalpalli).
 Tribute Honorée : Deepti Naval.

Awards

Grand Jury Prize for Best Feature:
VALLEY OF FLOWERS (Pan Nalin)
 Special Mention, VANAJA directed by Rajnesh Domalpalli

Grand Jury Prize for Best Documentary:
Q2P (Paromita Vohra)

Grand Jury Prize for Best Short:
TEA BREAK (Srinivas Sunderrajan)
 Special Mention, PRINTED RAINBOW directed by Gitanjali Rao

Audience Award for Best Feature:
Outsourced Directed by John Jeffcoat

Audience Award for Best Documentary:
DIVIDED WE FALL directed by Sharat Raju

Audience Award for Best Short:
MONSOON directed by Shyam Balsé

2008 
22–27 April 2008  at ArcLight Hollywood.

Tribute honoree: Madhuri Dixit.
Opening gala: Amal (Richie Mehta)
Closing gala: Mumbai Cutting...A City Unfolds

Program

 Docu shorts (QUAMAR - WORKING TO LIVE, SILENT HUES, UNDER THE AHMEDABAD SKY (Sotto Il Cielo Di Ahmedabad))
 BEFORE THE RAINS, A HOME IN THE SKY (Aevdhese Aabhaal), FOUR WOMEN (Naalu Pennungal), SUPER 30 (preceded by THE LOST RAINBOW)

 Narrative shorts (BEAST, LOVE STORY, THE LOST RAINBOW (Haravilele Indradhanush), MIDNIGHT LOST AND FOUND, THE MORNING RITUAL, THE RETURN (Vaapsi), REWIND, SARI (W)RAP, THREE OF US)

 KISSING COUSINS, THE POOL, LOST MOON (Khoya Khoya Chand), FROZEN
 
 Madhuri Dixit  tribute: THE DEATH SENTENCE (Mrityudand), JOHNNY GADDAAR

 Narrative shorts (BEAST, LOVE STORY, THE LOST RAINBOW (Haravilele Indradhanush), MIDNIGHT LOST AND FOUND, THE MORNING RITUAL, THE RETURN (Vaapsi), REWIND, SARI (W)RAP, THREE OF US)

 MY HEART IS CRAZY (Dil To Pagal Hai), THE SEA WITHIN (Ore Kadal), THE GLOW OF WHITE WOMEN
 AN UNENDING JOURNEY, Shot in Bombay, BOBBY

 Docu Shorts (QUAMAR - WORKING TO LIVE, SILENT HUES, UNDER THE AHMEDABAD SKY (Sotto Il Cielo Di Ahmedabad))
 STARS ON EARTH (Taare Zameen Par), THE SKY BELOW

2009 
April 21–27, 2009.

 Opening Night Gala:  The Fakir of Venice (Anand Surapur)
 Centerpiece Gala: Heaven on Earth (Deepa Mehta)
 Closing Gala: Yes Madam, Sir (docu, Megan Doneman)

Awards

Grand Jury Prize for Best Feature:
Sita Sings the Blues (Nina Paley)

Program

 SIKANDAR - Piyush Jha, FIRAAQ - Nandita Das, AIR INDIA 182 (docu, Sturla Gunnarsson), THE DAMNED RAIN (Gabhricha Paus, Satish Manwar),
 GANDHI, MY FATHER - Feroz Abbas Khan, LITTLE ZIZOU - Sooni Taraporevala, LEAVING HOME: THE LIFE AND MUSIC OF INDIAN OCEAN (Docu, Jaideep Varma)

 QUICK GUN MURUGAN - Shashank Ghosh, VIRASAT - Priyadarshan, KANCHIVARAM (Priyadarshan), CHILDREN OF THE PYRE (docu, Rajesh S. Jala),

 Sita Sings the Blues (Nina Paley), SIDDHARTH THE PRISONER (Pryas Gupta), BOMBAY SUMMER (Joseph Mathew Varghese), LAMHE (Yash Chopra)
 DHIN TAK DHA (short, Shraddha Pasi), Supermen of Malegaon (Faiza Ahmad Khan),  NAYA DAUR (B.R. Chopra), 7 DAYS IN SLOW MOTION (Umakanth Thumrugoti)

2010

2011

2012

2013

2014

2015

2016

2017

2018 
Audience Award for Best Picture - Take Off (Mahesh Narayanan)

2019 
April 11–14, 2019 at Regal L.A.

Opening Night Gala: Andhadhun

Centerpiece Gala:

Closing Gala: The Odds

Awards  
Grand Jury Prize for Best Feature: Wisdom of Silence

The audience awards: Vivek/Reason

See also
Film festivals in North and Central America

References

External links
Indian Film Festival of Los Angeles official website
Indian Film Festival of Los Angeles official press release - 12 March 2008
The Hollywood Reporter (article) - Indian film fest hits L.A. on April 22
The Times of India (article) - A cut above the rest?
Avenue a Grand Sponsor of 2008 IFFLA

Asian-American film festivals
Indian-American culture in Los Angeles
L
Film festivals in Los Angeles
2003 establishments in California
Film festivals established in 2003